Nicholas Swan was the member of the Parliament of England for Marlborough for the parliaments of March 1416, and 1420.

He is thought to have been a servant of the local landowner, Sir William Sturmy.

References 

Members of Parliament for Marlborough
English MPs March 1416
Year of birth unknown
Year of death unknown
English MPs 1420